Neoborella is a genus of plant bugs in the family Miridae. There are about five described species in Neoborella.

Species
These five species belong to the genus Neoborella:
 Neoborella canadensis Kelton & Herring, 1978
 Neoborella pseudotsugae Kelton & Herring, 1978
 Neoborella simplex (Reuter, 1908)
 Neoborella tumida Knight, 1925
 Neoborella xanthenes Herring, 1972

References

Further reading

 
 
 

Miridae genera
Articles created by Qbugbot
Mirini